This article refers to crime in the U.S. state of Nebraska.

Statistics
In 2008 there were 60,995 crimes reported in Nebraska, including 69 murders. 
In 2014 there were 52,727 crimes reported in Nebraska, including 53 murders.

Capital punishment laws

Capital punishment is legal in this state for aggravated murder. On November 8, 2016, voters decided to retain it in a statewide referendum.

By location 
 Crime in Omaha, Nebraska

References